Agata Trzebuchowska (born 12 April 1992) is a Polish screenwriter and film director. She debuted in the film industry playing the title role in the 2013 film Ida for which she was nominated for many festival and industry awards. She works as a journalist for Przekrój.

Discovery
Ida director Paweł Pawlikowski was having trouble finding an actress to play his title character, so he put out word to the Warsaw film community to be on the lookout for talent. Trzebuchowska was spotted by a friend of Pawlikowski, sitting in a cafe reading a book. Trzebuchowska had no acting experience or plans to pursue an acting career, but agreed to meet with Pawlikowski because she was a fan of his 2004 film My Summer of Love.

Filmography 
 2019: Vacancy (Director, Screenwriter)
 2018: The Kindler and The Virgin in The Field Guide to Evil (assistant director)
 2016: Heat (Director, Screenwriter)
 2013: Ida (title role)

Awards and nominations

References

External links
 
 Polish Shorts database

1992 births
Polish film directors
Polish women film directors
21st-century Polish actresses
Polish journalists
Polish women journalists
Living people